Linden House, built in 1950 in Vermillion, South Dakota, is notable as a rare example of postmodern architecture in South Dakota.  It was designed by Sioux City architects Hugill, Blatherwick & Fritzel.  It was listed on the National Register of Historic Places in 2001.

The house has a shake cedar roof and brick walls on concrete foundation.

References

Houses on the National Register of Historic Places in South Dakota
Houses completed in 1950
Houses in Clay County, South Dakota
Postmodern architecture in the United States
National Register of Historic Places in Clay County, South Dakota
Buildings and structures in Vermillion, South Dakota